Torre del Baró is a Rodalies de Catalunya station in the Nou Barris district of Barcelona in Catalonia, Spain. It was opened in the 1970s and, since 2003, interconnected with the Barcelona Metro station Torre Baró-Vallbona.

Other public transportation
Barcelona Metro: L11 at Torre Baró
TMB bus: 51, 62, 76, 83, 96, 97, 104

See also
List of railway stations in Barcelona
List of Rodalies Barcelona railway stations

References

External links
 Barcelona Torre del Baró listing at Rodalies de Catalunya website
 Information and photos of the station at Trenscat.com 

Railway stations in Barcelona
Transport in Nou Barris
Rodalies de Catalunya stations

it:Torre Baró-Vallbona (metropolitana di Barcellona)
nl:Torre Baró-Vallbona (metrostation)
pl:Torre Baró - Vallbona (stacja metra)